Markus Schlacher (born 23 August 1987) is an Austrian professional ice hockey defenceman playing for EC VSV of the Austrian Hockey League (EBEL).

References

External links

1987 births
Living people
Austrian ice hockey defencemen
EHC Black Wings Linz players
EC Red Bull Salzburg players
Skellefteå AIK players
Vienna Capitals players
EC VSV players